Vadim Aleksandrovich Steklov (born 24 March 1985) is a Russian former professional football player who played as a defensive midfielder or centre midfielder.

Club career
He made his Russian Premier League debut for FC Torpedo Moscow on 2 August 2014 in a game against PFC CSKA Moscow.

External links
 
 

1985 births
Footballers from Moscow
Living people
Russian footballers
Association football midfielders
FC Torpedo Moscow players
Russian Premier League players
FC Arsenal Tula players
FC Yenisey Krasnoyarsk players
FC Avangard Kursk players
FC Lukhovitsy players
FC Luch Vladivostok players
FC Irtysh Omsk players
FC Tekstilshchik Ivanovo players